Xenuroturris is a genus of sea snails, marine gastropod mollusks in the family Turridae, the turrids.

Species
Species within the genus Xenuroturris include:
 †Xenuroturris antiselli (F. Anderson & B. Martin, 1914)
 Xenuroturris castanella Powell, 1964
 Xenuroturris cerithiformis Powell, 1964: synonym of Iotyrris cerithiformis (Powell, 1964)
 Xenuroturris cingulifera (Lamarck, 1822): synonym of Iotyrris cingulifera (Lamarck, 1822)
 Xenuroturris emmae Bozzetti, 1993
 Xenuroturris gemmuloides Powell, 1967
 Xenuroturris kingae Powell, 1964
 Xenuroturris legitima Iredale, 1929
 Xenuroturris millepunctata (Sowerby III, 1908)
 † Xenuroturris subconcavus (G.F. Harris, 1897)

References

External links
 

Turridae